The Cuyuni River is a South American river and a tributary of the Essequibo River. It rises in the Guiana Highlands of Venezuela, where it descends northward to El Dorado, and turns eastward to meander through the tropical rain forests of the Cuyuni-Mazaruni Region of Guyana. It finally turns southeastward, flowing to its confluence with the Mazaruni River. 

Makarapan Mountain is a sandstone range by the Cuyuni.

History
In 1681, an island in the mouth of the Cuyuni River was cleared and planted with cassava for the use of the Dutch garrison. By 1694, a new plantation on the Cuyuni River above the fort was established. By 1703 a post was established on the Pariacot Savannah, in the upper Cuyuni.

On January 2, 1895, the "Incident of the Cuyuni river", so named by the general , was an armed confrontation between Venezuelans and British in the region of the river over the territorial dispute between Venezuela and British Guyana, which under Sifontes the Venezuelans left winners.

At dawn, British policemen led by an Inspector Barnes of England took an unoccupied military station of Venezuelan nationality, located on the left bank of the river. Barnes’ men hoisted the British flag during the day.

Captain Andrés Avelino Domínguez, second in command of Sifontes, was sent to recover the settlement. The result was the withdrawal of the British and the capture of Barnes and his men, who were taken to the General Police Station, which increased tensions between the two countries amid an internal crisis in Venezuela.

Settlement 
The river is a source of alluvial gold and attracts mining in the form of dredging. Illegal mining also occurs on the river banks, and mining also has exacerbated the border issue between Guyana and Venezuela.

Large-scale mining operation Aurora gold mine is on the Cuyuni River.

Development of a hydroelectric power site is under consideration at Kamaria on the Cuyuni River.

Venezuela 
El Dorado is a Venezuelan settlement on the Cuyuni River.

Guyana 
Some of the Kali'na people live in the Cuyuni River valley, part of which is in Guyana.

Eteringbang is a border settlement with an airstrip. Saint Martin and Ankoko Island have been the subject of further disputes between Venezuela and Guyana. In 2015, GDF forces continued observation from Eteringbang and Kaikan and other points along the river. 

The town of Bartica is close to the mouth of the Cuyuni where it meets with the confluence of Essequibo and Mazaruni rivers.

See also
Guayana Esequiba
Venezuela

References

Rivers of Guyana
Rivers of Venezuela
History of Guyana
Essequibo basin
International rivers of South America
Guyana–Venezuela border
Border rivers